The Southeastern Pennsylvania Transportation Authority (SEPTA) is a regional public transportation authority that operates bus, rapid transit, commuter rail, light rail, and electric trolleybus services for nearly four million people in five counties in and around Philadelphia, Pennsylvania. It also manages projects that maintain, replace and expand its infrastructure, facilities and vehicles.

SEPTA is the major transit provider for Philadelphia and the four surrounding counties, Delaware, Montgomery, Bucks, and Chester. It is a state-created authority, with the majority of its board appointed by the five Pennsylvania counties it serves. While several SEPTA commuter rail lines terminate in the nearby states of Delaware and New Jersey, additional service to Philadelphia from those states is provided by other agencies: the PATCO Speedline from Camden County, New Jersey is run by the Delaware River Port Authority, a bi-state agency; NJ Transit operates many bus lines and a commuter rail line to Philadelphia's Center City; and DART First State runs feeder bus lines to SEPTA stations in the state of Delaware.

SEPTA has the sixth-largest U.S. rapid transit system by ridership, and the fifth-largest overall transit system in the U.S. with about 302 million annual unlinked trips as of fiscal year 2018. It also oversees shared-ride services in Philadelphia and ADA services across the region, which are operated by third-party contractors, Amtrak, and NJ Transit.

SEPTA is one of only two U.S. transit authorities that operates all of the five major types of terrestrial transit vehicles: regional commuter rail trains, rapid transit subway and elevated trains, light rail trolleys, trolleybuses, and motorbuses; the other is Boston's Massachusetts Bay Transportation Authority, which also runs ferryboat service.)

History

Formation 

SEPTA was created by the Pennsylvania legislature on August 17, 1963, to coordinate government subsidies to various transit and railroad companies in southeastern Pennsylvania. It commenced on February 18, 1964.

On November 1, 1965, SEPTA absorbed two predecessor agencies:
 The Passenger Service Improvement Corporation (PSIC), was created on January 20, 1960, to work with the Reading Company and Pennsylvania Railroad to improve commuter rail service and help the railroads maintain otherwise unprofitable passenger rail service.
 The Southeastern Pennsylvania Transportation Compact (SEPACT), was created September 8, 1961, by the City of Philadelphia and the Counties of Montgomery, Bucks, and Chester to coordinate regional transport issues.

By 1966, the Reading Company and Pennsylvania Railroad commuter railroad lines were operated under contract to SEPTA. On February 1, 1968, the Pennsylvania Railroad merged with the New York Central railroad to become Penn Central, only to file for bankruptcy on June 21, 1970. Penn Central continued to operate in bankruptcy until 1976, when Conrail took over its assets along with those of several other bankrupt railroads, including the Reading Company. Conrail operated commuter services under contract to SEPTA until January 1, 1983, when SEPTA took over operations and acquired track, rolling stock, and other assets to form the Railroad Division.

Subsequent expansion 

Like New York City's Second Avenue Subway, the original proposal for the Roosevelt Boulevard Subway dates to 1913, but construction has remained elusive. Instead, after completing the Frankford Elevated, transit service in and around the city stagnated until the early 2000s.

On September 30, 1968, SEPTA acquired the Philadelphia Transportation Company (PTC), which operated a citywide system of bus, trolley, and trackless trolley routes, the Market–Frankford Line (subway-elevated rail), the Broad Street Line (subway) and the Delaware River Bridge Line (subway-elevated rail to City Hall, Camden, NJ) which became SEPTA's City Transit Division. The PTC had been created in 1940 with the merger of the Philadelphia Rapid Transit Company (formed in 1902) and a group of smaller, then-independent transit companies operating within the city and its environs.

On January 30, 1970, SEPTA acquired the Philadelphia Suburban Transportation Company, also known as the Red Arrow Lines, which included the Philadelphia and Western Railroad (P&W) route now called the Norristown High-Speed Line, the Media and Sharon Hill Lines (Routes 101 and 102) and several suburban bus routes in Delaware County. Today, this is the Victory Division, though it is sometimes referred to as the Red Arrow Division.

On March 1, 1976, SEPTA acquired the transit operations of Schuylkill Valley Lines, which is today the Frontier Division. Meanwhile, SEPTA gradually began to take over the Pennsylvania Railroad and Reading Company commuter trains. SEPTA primarily sought to consolidate the formerly-competing services, leading to severe cutbacks in the mid-1980s. Subsequent proposals have been made to restore service to Allentown, Bethlehem, West Chester, and Newtown, with support from commuters, local officials and pro-train advocates. SEPTA's planning department focused on the Schuylkill Valley Metro, a "cross-county metro" that would re-establish service to Phoenixville, Pottstown, and Reading without requiring the rider to go into Philadelphia. However, ridership projections were dubious, and the Federal Railroad Administration refused to fund the project.

Many derelict lines under SEPTA ownership have been converted to rail trails, postponing any restoration proposals for the foreseeable future. Proposals have also been made for increased service on existing lines, including later evenings and Sundays to Wilmington, Delaware and Newark in Delaware. Other recent proposals have focused on extending and enhancing SEPTA's other transit services. Senator Bob Casey has supported recent proposals expanding the Broad Street Line to the Philadelphia Naval Shipyard. , SEPTA had completed an Environmental Impact Statement to extend the Norristown High Speed Line to the King of Prussia area.

In September 2021, SEPTA proposed rebranding their rail transit services (the Market–Frankford Line, Broad Street Line, Subway–Surface trolley lines, Norristown High-Speed Line, Route 15 trolley, and Routes 101 and 102 trolleys) as the "SEPTA Metro", in order to make the system easier to navigate. Under this proposal, new maps, station signage, and line designations would be created. Under the proposed nomenclature, trunk lines would receive a letter and a color, with services having a numeric suffix and service name. For example, services along with the current Market–Frankford Line would be called the "L Lines" and colored blue, with local service becoming the "L1 Market–Frankford Local" and services along the current Broad Street Line would become the "B Lines" and colored orange, with local service becoming the "B1 Broad Street Local," express service becoming the "B2 Broad Street Express," special service becoming the "B2 Express Sports Special," and spur service becoming the "B3 Broad–Ridge Express." Services along the current subway–surface, Norristown High-Speed Line, Route 15 trolley, and Routes 101 and 102 suburban trolley trunk would receive would become the "T Lines," "M Lines," "G Lines," and "D Lines" respectively.

In March 2022, SEPTA revised the SEPTA Metro proposal based on feedback from a 2 month-long outreach period between September and October 2021. The amended proposal involved describing each lettered service by the word "Line" rather than "Lines." Special service along the Broad Street Line would become part of the "B2 Broad Street Express," with service being differentiated by their end terminals. As part of the proposal, the roll-out of real-time information was stated as a priority.

Governance 
SEPTA is governed by a 15-member board of directors:

 The City of Philadelphia appoints two members: one member is appointed by the Mayor, the other by the City Council President. These two board members can veto any item that is approved by the full SEPTA board because the city represents more than two-thirds of SEPTA's local subsidy, fare revenue, and ridership. However, the veto may be overridden with the vote of at least 75% of the full board within 30 days.
 Bucks, Chester, Delaware, and Montgomery counties appoint two members each. These members are appointed by the county commissioners in Bucks, Chester, and Montgomery and by the county council in Delaware.
 The majority and minority leaders of the two houses of the Pennsylvania State Legislature (the Senate and the House of Representatives) appoint one member each, for a total of four members.
 The governor appoints one member.

The members of the SEPTA Board  are:

The day-to-day operations of SEPTA are handled by the general manager, who is appointed and hired by the board of directors. The general manager is assisted by nine department heads called assistant general managers.

The present general manager is Leslie Richards. Past general managers include Jeffrey Knueppel, Joseph Casey, Faye L. M. Moore, Joseph T. Mack, John "Jack" Leary, Louis Gambaccini, and David L. Gunn. Past acting general managers include James Kilcur and Bill Stead.

SEPTA is a member of the Northeast Corridor Commission, a federal commission on Northeast Corridor rail service.

Routes and ridership

Ridership 

Overall annual ridership for the fiscal year of 2020 was 223.5 million individual rides. 17.1 million were rides on SEPTA's suburban network. 26.3 million were rides on SEPTA's "regional rail" network. 180.1 million were rides on SEPTA's "city transit" network.

Ridership had decreased 13% from 2014 to 2019 due to many factors. Some explanations mentioned by SEPTA for this decrease are "increased competition, structural changes in ridership patterns, and moderate gas prices." The
24% decrease in ridership from FY 2019 to FY 2020 was mostly due to the impact of government-implemented lock-downs in response to the COVID-19 pandemic that started mid-March 2020.

Rapid transit 
 Market–Frankford Line (Blue Line or El): subway and elevated line from the Frankford Transportation Center (rebuilt in 2003) in the Frankford section of Philadelphia to 69th Street Transportation Center in Upper Darby, via Center City Philadelphia. Weekday ridership averaged 191,716 in 2018.
 Broad Street Line and Broad–Ridge Spur (Orange Line): subway line along Broad Street in Philadelphia from Fern Rock Transportation Center to NRG Station/Sports Complex (formerly Pattison Station and AT&T Station) Or 8th and Market, via Center City Philadelphia. Weekday ridership averaged 139,950 in 2018.

Both rapid transit lines run from 5:00 a.m. to 1:00 a.m. Monday through Thursday, with overnight shuttle bus service running along the line from 1:00 a.m. to 5:00 a.m. Prior to COVID-19, the lines ran nonstop from 5:00 a.m. on Friday to 1:00 on Monday morning. As of late, the trains no longer run all day on weekends and shuttle buses replace trains in the same way that they do during the week.

Interurban transit 
 Norristown High Speed Line (Purple Line): formerly known as the Philadelphia & Western (P&W) Railroad and Route 100, this former interurban heavy rail line is powered by third rail and has high level platforms. Daily ridership averaged 10,895 in 2018. It runs from 5:00 a.m. to 1:00 a.m. seven days a week.

Trolley and light rail 

 Subway–Surface Trolley Lines (Green Line): Five Subway-Surface Trolley Routes—10, 11, 13, 34 and 36 run in a subway in Center City and fan out along on street-level as Surface Trolley Lines in West and Southwest Philadelphia, and the Darby and Yeadon boroughs of Delaware County, Pennsylvania. Weekday ridership averaged 62,242 in 2018. Routes 10, 13 and 36 run 24 hours a day while Routes 11 and 34 run from roughly 4:30 am to 2 am. 
 SEPTA Routes 101 and 102 (Suburban Trolley Lines): two trolley routes in Delaware County which run mostly on private rights-of-way but also have some street running. Daily ridership averaged 8,476 in 2018.
 Routes 15, 23 and 56: Three surface trolley routes that were suspended in 1992. Routes 23 and 56 are currently operated with buses. Trolley service on Route 15 (the Girard Avenue Line) resumed in September 2005, operating as a heritage streetcar line but was suspended again for at least eighteen months due to maintenance issues and major roadwork; it last operated in January 2020. 4 out of the 18 trolleys passed internal mechanical inspection before everything was converted to bus. Route 23 has long been SEPTA's most heavily traveled surface route, with daily ridership averaging 21,500 in 2010. The route has now split into Route 23 (northern portion remains) and Route 45 (southern portion).
 Route 15 is slated to restart trolley service in January 2023 with rebuilt "PCC III" cars. 
 SEPTA has the largest trolley system in the United States.

Trackless trolley (trolleybus) 

Trolleybuses, or trackless trolleys as they are called by SEPTA, operate on routes 59, 66, and 75. Service resumed in spring 2008 after a nearly five-year suspension. Until June 2002, five SEPTA routes were operated with trackless trolleys, using AM General vehicles built in 1978–79. Routes 29, 59, 66, 75 and 79 used trackless trolleys, but were converted to diesel buses for an indefinite period starting in 2002 (routes 59, 66, 75) and 2003 (routes 29, 79). The aging AM General trackless trolleys were retired and in February 2006, SEPTA placed an order for 38 new low-floor trackless trolleys from New Flyer Industries—enough for routes 59, 66 and 75 only—and the pilot trackless trolley arrived in June 2007, for testing. The vehicles were delivered between February and August 2008. Trackless trolley service resumed on Routes 66 and 75 on April 14, 2008, and on Route 59 the following day, but was initially limited to just one or two vehicles on each route, as new trolley buses gradually replaced the motorbuses serving the routes over a period of several weeks. The SEPTA board voted in October 2006 not to order additional vehicles for Routes 29 and 79, and those routes permanently became non-electric.

Bus 

SEPTA lists 121 bus routes, not including over 50 school trips, with most routes in the City of Philadelphia proper. SEPTA generally employs lettered, one and two-digit route numbering for its City Division routes; 90-series and 100-series routes for its Suburban Division routes; 200-series routes for its Regional Rail connector routes (Routes 201, 204, and 206 in Montgomery & Chester Counties); 300-series routes for other specialized or third-party contract routes; and 400-series routes for limited-service buses to schools within Philadelphia.

Commuter rail 

On January 1, 1983, SEPTA took over the commuter rail services formerly operated by Conrail under contract and reorganized them as Regional Rail. This division operates 13 lines serving more than 150 stations covering most of the five-county southeastern Pennsylvania region. It also runs trains to Wilmington, Delaware, and Newark, Delaware as well as Trenton and West Trenton, New Jersey. Daily ridership averaged over 120,000 in 2018, with over 30% of ridership on the Paoli/Thorndale and Lansdale/Doylestown lines.

Most of the cars used on the lines were built between 1976 and 2013. After building delays, the first Silverliner V cars were introduced into service on October 29, 2010. These cars represent the first new electric multiple units purchased for the Regional Rail system since the completion of the Silverliner IV order in 1976 and the first such purchase to be made by SEPTA. As of March 19, 2013, all Silverliner V cars are in service and makeup almost one-third of the current 400 car Regional Rail fleet, which are replacing the older, aging fleet. At the start of July 2016, however, a serious structural flaw (cracks in a weight-bearing beam on a train car's undercarriage) was discovered during an emergency inspection to exist in more than 95% of the 120 Silverliner V cars in the SEPTA regional rail fleet which the company announced would take "the rest of the summer" to repair and would thus reduce the system's capacity by as much as 50%. In addition to regular commuter rail service, the loss of system capacity was also expected to cause transportation issues for the Democratic National Convention being held in Philadelphia on the week of July 25, 2016.

Accessibility 
All of SEPTA's buses are fully accessible under the requirements of the Americans with Disabilities Act (ADA). As of February 2022, about 46% of its subway and commuter rail stations combined are ADA-compliant, which is the second-lowest accessibility rate for rail stops in the country (the New York City Subway, at 28% as of September 2021, has the lowest in the nation). The trolleys themselves, meanwhile, are fully inaccessible, meaning that no trolley stop can possibly be compliant with the ADA. SEPTA was sued successfully over its lack of accessibility back in 2009.

Divisions 
SEPTA has three major operating divisions: City Transit, Suburban, and Regional Rail. These divisions reflect the different transit and railroad operations that SEPTA has assumed. SEPTA also offers CCT Connect paratransit ⎌service.

City Transit Division 

The City Transit Division operates routes mostly within Philadelphia, including buses, subway–surface trolleys, one surface trolley line, the Market–Frankford Line, and the Broad Street Line. SEPTA City Transit Division surface routes include bus and trackless trolley lines. Some city division routes extend into Delaware, Montgomery, and Bucks counties. This division is the descendant of the Philadelphia Transportation Company. Aside from the two heavy rail lines, the City Transit Division has eight operating depots in this division: five of these depots only operate buses, one is a mixed bus/trackless trolley depot, one is a mixed bus/streetcar depot and one is a streetcar-only facility.

Suburban Division

Victory District 

The Victory District operates suburban bus and trolley (or light rail) routes that are based at 69th Street Transportation Center in Upper Darby in Delaware County. Its light rail routes comprise the Norristown High Speed Line (Route 100) that runs from 69th Street Transportation Center to Norristown Transportation Center and the SEPTA Surface Media and Sharon Hill Trolley Lines (Routes 101 and 102). This district is the descendant of the Philadelphia Suburban Transportation Company, also known as the Red Arrow Lines. Some residents of the Victory District operating area still refer to this district as the "Red Arrow Division."

Frontier District 
The Frontier District operates suburban bus routes that are based at the Norristown Transportation Center in Montgomery County and bus lines that serve eastern Bucks County. This district is the descendant of the Schuylkill Valley Lines in the Norristown area and the Trenton-Philadelphia Coach Lines in eastern Bucks County. SEPTA took over Schuylkill Valley Lines operations on March 1, 1976. SEPTA turned over the Bucks County routes (formerly Trenton-Philadelphia Coach Line Routes, a subsidiary of SEPTA) to Frontier Division in November 1983.

Suburban contract operations 
Krapf Transit operates one bus line under contract to SEPTA in Chester County: Route 204 between Paoli Regional Rail Station and Eagleville. This route is operated from Krapf's own garage, located in West Chester, Pennsylvania. Krapf has operated three other bus routes for SEPTA in the past. Route 202 (West Chester to Wilmington), Route 207 (The Whiteland WHIRL) and Route 208 (Strafford Train Station to Chesterbrook) are no longer operating. SEPTA contracted bus operations before in Chester County. SEPTA and Reeder's Inc. joined forces in 1977 to operate three bus routes out of West Chester. These routes were Route 120 (West Chester to Coatesville), Route 121 (West Chester to Paoli), and Route 122 (West Chester to Oxford). Bus service between West Chester and Coatesville was a replacement for the previous trolley service operated by West Chester Traction. SEPTA did replace two of the routes with their own bus service. Route 122 service was replaced by SEPTA's Route 91 on July 6, 1982, after only one year of service, Route 91 was eliminated due to lack of ridership. Route 121 was replaced by SEPTA's Route 92 on October 11, 1982, and this service continues to operate today. Since ridership on the Route 120 was strong it continued to operate under the operations of Reeder's Inc. even after SEPTA pulled the funding source. Krapf purchased the Reeder's operation in 1992 and designated the remaining (West Chester to Coatesville) bus route as Krapf Transit "Route A". Route 205 (Paoli Station to Chesterbrook) was formerly operated by Krapf until late 2019 when it was merged into SEPTA's own Route 206 (Paoli Station to Great Valley).

Railroad Division 

The Railroad Division operates 13 commuter railroad routes that begin in Center City Philadelphia and radiate outwards, terminating in intra-city, suburban and out-of-state locations.

This division is the descendant of the six electrified commuter lines of the Reading Company (RDG), the six electrified commuter lines of the Pennsylvania Railroad (PRR, later Penn Central: PC), and the new Airport line constructed by the City of Philadelphia between 1974 and 1984.

With the construction and opening of the Center City Commuter Connection Tunnel in 1984, lines were paired such that a former Pennsylvania Railroad line was coupled with a former Reading line. Seven such pairings were created and given route designations numbered R1 through R8 (with R4 not used). Since ridership patterns have changed since the implementation of this plan, SEPTA removed the R-numbers from the lines in July 2010 and instead refers to the lines by the names of their termini.

The out-of-state terminals offer connections with other transit agencies. The Trenton Line offers connections in Trenton, New Jersey to NJ Transit (NJT) or Amtrak for travel to New York City. Plans exist to restore NJT service to West Trenton, New Jersey, thus offering a future alternate to New York via the West Trenton Line and NJT. Another plan offers a connection for travel to Baltimore and Washington, D.C. via MARC, involving extensions of the SEPTA Wilmington/Newark Line from Newark, Delaware, an extension of MARC's Penn service from Perryville, Maryland, or both.

CCT Connect 

CCT Connect is a paratransit service from SEPTA that offers a Shared-Ride Program for senior citizens and ADA Paratransit Service for people with disabilities. The Shared-Ride Program provides a door-to-door ridesharing service through advance reservations for senior citizens age 65 or older in the city of Philadelphia for travel within the city and to points within  of the city's borders. The ADA Paratransit Service provides door-to-door service through advance reservations for people with disabilities in accordance with the Americans with Disabilities Act (ADA), allowing for travel across the SEPTA service area within  of fixed-route transit service when such service operates. CCT Connect is operated by third-party contractors for SEPTA. Easton Coach, First Transit, MV Transportation, and Total Transit Corp. operate CCT Connect service in Philadelphia County; Easton Coach operates CCT Connect service in Bucks County; Krapf Transit operates CCT Connect service in Chester County; Community Transit of Delaware County operates CCT Connect service in Delaware County; and First Transit operates CCT Connect service in Montgomery County.

Financing 
SEPTA is considered a non-profit. SEPTA gets income from passenger fares, investments, and multiple government agencies to cover operating costs.

Operating costs 
SEPTA had $1,530,984,000 in total operating expenses for the fiscal year of 2021. $1,088,773,000 (71.1%) of those expenses are considered "Labor and Fringe Benefits." $331,432,000 (21.6%) of those expenses are "Material and Services" costs. $27,313,000 (1.8%) are due to "Propulsion Power" costs. $26,026,000 (1.7%) are due to "Fuel" costs. $24,711,000 (1.6%) are for "Injury and Damage Claims." $23,875,000 (1.6%) are due to "Depreciation/Contributed Capital" costs. The last $8,854,000 (.5%) in costs are due to "Vehicle and Facility Rentals".

Operating revenue 
To cover 35% of their operating costs, SEPTA receives $541,768,000 in operating revenue, which includes: $480,574,000 (88.7%) from passenger revenue, $16,250,000 (3%) from SEPTA's "Shared Ride Program," $42,188,000 (7.8%) from "Other Income," and $2,756,000 (.5%) from "Investment Income".

Government subsidies 

To make up for the $989,200,000 gap in operating expenses for FY2021, SEPTA receives 65% of its FY2021 income from federal, state, and local government subsidies. SEPTA receives this financial support in the form of direct subsidies, grants, income from a Pennsylvanian sales tax, proceeds from state bond programs, and lease subsidies.

$779,842,000 (78.8%) of SEPTA's funding short-fall is covered by a combination of state government subsidies. $111,986,000 (11.3%) of SEPTA's funding short-fall is covered by local government programs. $93,028,000 (9.4%) of SEPTA's funding short-fall is covered by the Federal government. $4,360,000 (.5%) of the gap is covered by "Other" means.

As of June 2022, SEPTA will no longer receive $180,000,000 annually from the Pennsylvania Turnpike Commission as a result of Act 89, signed into law in 2013. Under Act 89, this subsidy will become $50,000,000 for the 2023 fiscal year, and then eventually nothing.

Fares 

The SEPTA Key card is a smart card that can be used for fares and passes on SEPTA's transit services and Regional Rail. The card replaced tokens, paper tickets, and paper passes.

The cash fare to ride on SEPTA's transit services (buses, rapid transit, trolleys, trackless trolleys) is $2.50, which must be paid in exact change. SEPTA offered tokens as a discount to cash, with each token costing $2; tokens could only be purchased in packs of 2, 5, or 10. Token sales were discontinued in 2018 with an exception for CCT users but are still accepted on transit services. The Travel Wallet on the SEPTA Key card offers single rides on transit for $2. Transfers from one SEPTA transit service to another are available with a SEPTA Key card with money loaded on the Travel Wallet; the first transfer is free while the second transfer costs $1. A number of interchanges between rapid transit lines can be used for free, without a transfer. Fares for CCT Connect service cost $4.25.

On Regional Rail, fares can be paid with the Travel Wallet on a SEPTA Key card or onboard the train from a conductor using cash or credit card. Sales of paper tickets were discontinued in 2020; however, valid tickets were still accepted on trains until April 1, 2021. As of April 2, 2021, previously purchased paper tickets were no longer accepted on Regional Rail. Fares using a SEPTA Key card are cheaper than fares purchased on board. Fares on Regional Rail are based on fare zones reflecting the station's distance from Center City Philadelphia. Fares are higher during the day on weekdays and lower on evenings and weekends. SEPTA also offers intermediate fares for trips on Regional Rail that do not go through Center City Philadelphia along with via Center City Philadelphia fares that can be used between two outlying stations that require travel through Center City Philadelphia.

Various passes are offered by SEPTA that can be used on transit and Regional Rail services. These passes are available on a SEPTA Key card. The TransPass costs $25.50 weekly and $96 monthly and can be used for all transit rides within the time period. The TransPass is not valid on Regional Rail. The TrailPass is available either weekly or monthly and can be used on Regional Rail up to the zone printed on the pass along with all transit rides within the time period. Prices for the TrailPass are based on fare zones reflecting distance from Center City Philadelphia. TrailPasses have anywhere privileges on weekends and holidays. The Cross County Pass costs $30.75 weekly and $115 monthly and can be used for all transit rides and all Regional Rail trips outside Center City Philadelphia within the time period. The pass can be used with a payment of an additional Zone 1 fare for travel into Center City Philadelphia. Cross County Passes have anywhere privileges on weekends and holidays. The One-Day Independence Pass can be used for up to 10 trips in one day on transit and Regional Rail services, with an individual pass $13 and a three-pass bundle $36. An additional charge of $3.75 per individual pass must be paid for Regional Rail travel in New Jersey. The One-Day Convenience Pass allows for 8 rides on transit services in one day for $9, while the Three-Day Convenience Pass allows for 24 rides on transit services in a 72-hour period for $18.00.

SEPTA allows senior citizens to ride transit services and Regional Rail trains in Pennsylvania for free with identification; fares on Regional Rail trains operating to Delaware or New Jersey are half the weekday fare. Disabled persons may ride transit services for half price and Regional Rail trains for half the weekday fare with identification. SEPTA allows all children under the age of 12 to ride for free with a fare-paying adult; children riding alone must pay regular fares.

SEPTA offers special fares for students in K–12 schools who ride SEPTA to get to school. The SEPTA Key Student Fare Card program provides students with a SEPTA Key card that can be used for up to 8 trips per school day. Cards can be upgraded to be used on Regional Rail. SEPTA offers the SEPTA Key University Pass as a discount transit pass for college students at participating colleges. Colleges participating in the SEPTA Key University Pass program include University of Pennsylvania, Temple University, Drexel University, University of the Arts, and University of the Sciences.

The Freedom Share Card farecard used by PATCO Speedline is accepted on all SEPTA services except Regional Rail. The card is read at SEPTA Key card readers.

Transit police 

SEPTA established it current Transit Police Department in 1981. It now has about 260 officers operating in seven patrol zones. It maintains a patrol, bicycle, and police dog unit, and a Special Operations Response Team trained to deal with potential hostage situations.

Equipment

Buses 

In 1982, SEPTA ordered buses from Neoplan USA, a purchase that was both the largest for Neoplan at the time and SEPTA's largest to date. These buses were used throughout the SEPTA service area. SEPTA changed its specifications on new bus orders each year. The Neoplan AK's (numbered 8285–8410), which was SEPTA's first Neoplan order, had longitudinal seating: all of the seats face towards the aisle. However, their suburban counterparts (8411–8434) had longitudinal seating only in the rear of the bus. The back door has a wheelchair ramp, which forced SEPTA officials to limit its use and specify wheelchair lifts in their next order. These buses had a nine-liter 6v92 engine and Allison HT-747 transmission.

In 1983, SEPTA, along with other transit operators in Pennsylvania, ordered 1,000 Neoplan buses of various lengths. SEPTA ultimately received 450 buses from this order: 425 were  buses (BD 8435–8584 and CD 8601–8875), which came without wheelchair lifts, and 25  buses (BP 1301–1325).

SEPTA purchased additional Neoplans in 1986. The first two groups (3000–3131 and 3132–3251) came without rear wheelchair lifts; the last two groups, one in late 1987 (3252–3371) and another in 1989 (3372–3491), included them. All Neoplans built between 1986 and 1989 were equipped with a ZF 4HP-590 transmission.

By the early 1990s, SEPTA had 1,092 Neoplan AN440 coaches in active service, making it the largest transit system in North America with a fleet primarily manufactured by Neoplan USA. These buses dominated the streets of Philadelphia through late 1997 when the earlier fleet of AK and BD Neoplans (8285–8581) was replaced by 400 buses built by American Ikarus and – the same company after a 1996 reorganization – North American Bus Industries. The older GMC RTS 35- and 40-foot buses were also replaced in this order, with the sole remaining exception of No. 4462, a 35-foot coach. More replacements occurred when SEPTA received its first low-floor fleet and retired the last AN440 buses on June 20, 2008.

The Neoplan model had not entirely vanished from Philadelphia's streets by the start of the 21st century; in 1998, SEPTA ordered 155 articulated buses from the company. These buses replaced the 1984 Volvo 10BM 60-foot articulated buses. These buses have now been retired since late 2015, replaced by the 2013–2016 NovaBus LFS-A HEV.

The 1998 purchase also included 89 29-foot Transmark-29 buses from National-Eldorado (4501–4580, 4581 received later), the first of which began to arrive in late 2000. Most of these buses ran on suburban routes occasionally entering the city, but some are in the "LUCY" service in the University City section of West Philadelphia, in a special paint scheme, and others on lighter lines within Philadelphia. SEPTA had decided to buy from Metrotrans Legacy, SEPTA's first choice in small buses, but the company filed for bankruptcy in 1999.

A fleet of buses known as "cutaways" were also purchased. These buses were built on Ford van chassis, with bodies similar to those seen on car rental shuttles at various airports. These buses were retired around 2003 and replaced with slightly larger cutaway buses on a Freightliner truck chassis.

After evaluating sample buses from New Flyer and NovaBus in 1994–96, SEPTA ordered 100 low-floor buses (nos. 5401–5500) from New Flyer in 2001.

Trackless trolley (trolley bus) service was suspended in 2003 and the 110 AM General vehicles that had provided service on SEPTA's five trackless trolley routes never returned to service. However, in early 2006 SEPTA ordered 38 new low-floor trackless trolleys from New Flyer, which entered service in 2008, restoring trackless service on routes 59, 66 and 75. These buses replaced SEPTA Neoplan EZs, ending Neoplan's 26-year domination.

SEPTA placed an order with delivery starting in 2008 for 400 New Flyer hybrid buses—with options for up to 80 additional buses to replace the NABI Ikarus buses at the end of their 12-year life. These will not be the first hybrid buses, since SEPTA purchased two small groups of hybrids, 5601H–5612H, which arrived in 2003, and 5831H–5850H in 2004. Before the 2008 purchase, SEPTA borrowed an MTA New York City Transit Orion VII hybrid bus # 6365 to evaluate it in service. SEPTA was the first to purchase New Flyer DE40LFs equipped with rooftop HVAC units. SEPTA delivered 525 2017–2022 NFI XDE40 hybrid buses to replace all the diesel buses that were delivered between 2001 and 2004. Additionally, SEPTA is replacing cloth seats with plastic seats on their buses that were delivered since and after 2008 in an effort to combat bed bug infestations.

SEPTA's revenue from advertisements on the backs of its buses leads the authority to order mainly buses equipped with a rooftop HVAC and with their rear route-number sign mounted on the roof, especially on 2008–2009 New Flyer DE40LFs and future orders.

In 2016, SEPTA launched a pilot program that would see battery electric buses replace diesel buses on former trackless trolley routes 29 and 79. Using a $2.6-million Federal Transit Administration grant, the agency ordered 25 such buses from Proterra, Inc. of California, together with two overhead fast-charging stations. They are expected to enter service in 2017, returning electric propulsion to these routes after nearly 15 years of diesel operation. However, these same busses were sidelined in February, 2020 for an undisclosed reason, but multiple agency sources blamed a defect in the buses’ plastic chassis that led to a cracking problem.

Subway 

The Broad Street Line uses cars built by Kawasaki between 1982 and 1984. These cars, known as B-IV as they are the fourth generation used on the line, are stainless steel and include some cars with operating cabs at both ends, as well as some with only a single cab.

The Market-Frankford Line uses a class of cars known as M-4, as they, like the Broad Street B-IVs, represent the line's fourth generation of cars and were built from 1997 to 1999 by Adtranz. In 2017, 90 cars had emergency welding to fix cracking steel beams. Then in 2020 all the cars, including the ones temporarily repaired in 2017, had to have more permanent welding to fix cracking steel beams.

Trolley 
The SEPTA trolley fleet has three different types of cars.

The 112 vehicles used on the SEPTA Subway–Surface trolley lines (Routes 10, 11, 13, 34, and 36) were built by Kawasaki beginning in 1981 after a 1980 prototype was delivered and tested. Known as "K-cars", they use the  Pennsylvania trolley gauge. They also were the first in North America to have unitized roof-mounted air conditioners and to have electronic control of switches at junctions. The city cars operate out of two depots, Elmwood and Callowhill.

The suburban trolley lines (Routes 101 and 102) use 29 Kawasaki-built vehicles similar to, but slightly larger than, the Subway–Surface trolleys. They use a slightly wider track gauge than the city lines –  – but the same wheel gauge. Wheel profiles are different and different gear ratios provide higher speeds. Notably, they are double-ended, unlike the Subway-Surface trolleys, as these lines lack any loops to turn the vehicles at their suburban terminals.

SEPTA Route 15 (Girard Avenue Line) uses PCC cars. These cars were originally built in 1947 by the St. Louis Car Company and were rebuilt by Brookville (and renamed PCC II) for the line's reopening in 2003 to include air conditioning and a wheelchair lift. The Girard line has the same  Pennsylvania trolley gauge as the Subway-Surface lines and operates out of Callowhill depot. Since 2020, these cars are once again being rebuilt by SEPTA and when scheduled to return in 2023, they will feature plastic seating.

Regional Rail 

SEPTA's regional rail services primarily use a fleet of "Silverliner" electric multiple unit cars. During rush-hour service they are supplemented by a small fleet of unpowered passenger cars, based on the "Comet" family of railcars, hauled by 15 Siemens ACS-64 electric locomotives.

Interurban 
The Norristown High Speed Line uses a unique class of 26 cars known as N-5s. They were delivered in 1993 by ABB after significant production difficulties and a change of assembly locations. These cars are powered by a nominally 600 volt top-contact third rail. They run on a standard gauge track. They are the first fleet of cars in North America to have Alternating Current (AC) traction motors. Additionally, they have running gear (trucks) incorporating design elements used on the Swedish High-Speed trains. Axle suspensions provide flexibility that allows axles to steer themselves around curves as small as 5 degrees.

Maintenance facilities 
Transit Divisions
 69th Street Yard (City Transit Division/ Market–Frankford Line, the facility is actually located in Delaware County)
 Allegheny Depot (City Transit Division/ articulated and standard size buses; formerly housed Nearside, double-ended, and PCC streetcars)
 Berridge Shops (formerly Wyoming Shops, bus maintenance, and overhauls)
 Bridge Street Yard (City Transit Division/ Market–Frankford Line)
 Callowhill Depot (City Transit Division/ bus and streetcar; formerly housed Nearside, Peter Witt, double-ended, and PCC streetcars)
 Comly Depot (City Transit Division/ articulated and standard size buses)
 Elmwood Depot (City Transit Division/ streetcar, also used as a station. Replaced former Woodland Depot)
 Fern Rock Yard (City Transit Division/ Broad Street Line)
 Frankford Depot (City Transit Division/ bus and trackless trolley; formerly housed Nearside, double-ended, and PCC streetcars)
 Frontier Depot (Suburban Transit Division/ bus)
 Germantown Brakes Maintenance Facility (Germantown Depot, City Transit Division/ bus maintenance)
 Midvale Depot (City Transit Division/ articulated, standard size, and formerly housed  buses. Replaced former Luzerne Depot)
 Southern Depot (City Transit Division/ articulated and standard size buses: SEPTA board voted to not have trackless trolleys return to South Philly; formerly housed Nearside, double-ended and Peter Witt streetcars)
 Victory Depot (69th Street, Suburban Transit Division/ bus and light rail)
 Woodland Maintenance Facility (streetcar overhaul and repairs. Site of former Woodland Depot, which formerly housed Nearside, double-ended, and PCC streetcars)

Regional Rail

Connecting transit agencies in the Philadelphia region

Local services 

The PATCO Speedline is a rapid transit line that runs from Center City Philadelphia to Camden, New Jersey and terminates in Lindenwold, New Jersey. At the 8th Street station, one can transfer to the Market–Frankford Line and Broad–Ridge Spur with an additional transfer fare. Paid transfers are also available at PATCO's 12th–13th Street station and 15th–16th Street station with SEPTA's Broad Street Line Walnut–Locust station. The PATCO Speedline crosses over the Delaware River via the Ben Franklin Bridge. It is owned by the Delaware River Port Authority.

In the western Philadelphia suburbs, Krapf's Transit runs regularly scheduled buses for the TMACC between Coatesville and Parkesburg and between West Chester, Pennsylvania West Chester and Oxford. Krapf's also provides contract services to SEPTA on route 204. They also operate a free express shuttle bus from Center City to the Navy Yard in South Philadelphia as well as a free shuttle bus loop within the Navy Yard itself.

In King of Prussia, the Greater Valley Forge Transportation Management Association runs a community shuttle, the Rambler, which connects with SEPTA at the King of Prussia Transit Center.

In the northwestern Philadelphia suburbs, Pottstown Area Rapid Transit (PART, formerly known as Pottstown Urban Transit) operates five bus routes within Pottstown Borough and the neighboring townships of Douglass, Limerick, Lower Pottsgrove, Upper Pottsgrove, and West Pottsgrove in Montgomery County and North Coventry Township in Chester County. PART and SEPTA have an agreement allowing transfers between PART service and SEPTA Route 93 buses in Pottstown.

Regional services 
NJ Transit runs buses from Philadelphia to various New Jersey points. Many NJT buses stop at the Philadelphia Greyhound Terminal, which is immediately north of Jefferson Station or at other locations in Center City Philadelphia. NJT also operates the River Line light rail line between Camden and Trenton, the Northeast Corridor Line between Trenton and New York, and the Atlantic City Line between 30th Street Station and Atlantic City. Both the Northeast Corridor Line and River Line connect with SEPTA's Regional Rail Trenton Line at the Trenton Transit Center. SEPTA Route 127 connects with NJT bus and rail services here also.

DART First State provides bus service in Delaware. This service connects with SEPTA's Wilmington/Newark Line Regional Rail service in Wilmington, Delaware, and Newark, Delaware. In 2007, SEPTA bus Route 306 began service, connecting the Great Valley Corporate Center and West Chester with the Brandywine Town Center; service between West Chester and Brandywine Town Center was discontinued in 2010 due to low ridership. In February 2009, SEPTA bus Route 113 commenced connecting bus service with DART at the Tri-State Mall, allowing service between Delaware County and the State of Delaware, and connecting with DART First State's #1 (now #13) and #61 bus at the Tri-State Mall.

National and international services 

Amtrak provides rail service between 30th Street Station and Lancaster, Harrisburg, Pittsburgh, and Chicago to the west, Baltimore and Washington, D.C. to the southwest, and New York, Boston, and Montreal to the northeast. SEPTA's Wilmington/Newark Line and Trenton Line run along Amtrak's Northeast Corridor, while SEPTA's Paoli/Thorndale Line runs along the far eastern leg of Amtrak's Philadelphia to Harrisburg Main Line and Keystone Corridor. All Regional Rail routes stop at 30th Street Station's upper platform. It is a short walk down a ramp to Amtrak's gates. Amtrak is faster than SEPTA, but significantly more expensive, particularly for services along the Northeast Corridor.

Greyhound and a variety of interregional bus operators, most of which are part of the Trailways system, stop at the Philadelphia Greyhound Terminal. In addition to being adjacent to Jefferson Station, the terminal is one block from the Market–Frankford Line's  station and various SEPTA bus routes. Major destinations served with one-seat rides to/from the terminal include Allentown, Pennsylvania Allentown, Atlantic City, Baltimore, Harrisburg, Newark (New Jersey), New York, Pittsburgh, Reading, Scranton, Washington and Wilmington. In addition, six NJ Transit bus routes (313, 315, 316, 317, 318, and 551) originate and terminate from this terminal.

SEPTA serves Philadelphia International Airport with local bus service and with the Airport Line from Center City.

Criticism and recognition

20th century
SEPTA's 50-year history has often been a tumultuous one, a direct result of the agency being governed at the county level rather than the state one. Railpace Newsmagazine contributor Gerry Williams observed that SEPTA regularly staggers from crisis to crisis, with little support or oversight originating at the state level in Harrisburg. It has a long history of being at odds with the riding public and both county and state officials. SEPTA has had more labor strikes than any other transit agency in the U.S., occurring in 1977, 1981, 1983, 1986, 1995, 1998, 2005, 2009, 2014, and 2016.

Williams commented that there is a notable lack of "any group... influential enough to bring shame on SEPTA," adding that SEPTA's chronic ills "merely reflect the broader problems of local provincialism and petty political squabbles which are so rampant within the (Delaware Valley) region." The five counties it serves regularly have various hidden agendas working in the background, often at cross purposes with one another than as a unified region, a problem that has resulted in many services being severed mid-route without regard to the affected counties. This factor is regularly influenced by the changing political winds at the state capital in Harrisburg.

21st century
SEPTA made improvements in the 21st century that helped reverse the downward trend. $191 million of funds made available from the American Recovery and Reinvestment Act of 2009 were utilized to make over 30 major improvements to the system, including renovations of the Spring Garden and Girard Avenue subway stations and building the first Leadership in Energy and Environmental Design (LEED) station at Fox Chase terminal in 2010. SEPTA also inaugurated a consolidated, multi-modal control center that helps manage all aspects of the system.

SEPTA was voted the best large transit agency in North America by the American Public Transportation Association (APTA) in July 2012. The award was criticized by Next City columnist Diana Lind, stating that despite some outward appearances of improvement, SEPTA still largely operates under a cloud of non-transparency and continues to lack a system-wide expansion program for the future. This is most notable in the regional rail division, which suffered severe cutbacks in the 1980s and whose affected routes have been converted into rail trails, preventing a restoration of those services for the foreseeable future. When asked to produce data pertaining to SEPTA's repeated attempts to consolidate bus stops, Lind observed "the report on the project barely elaborates on the information. SEPTA’s trials deserve public attention and input. The public deserves the data—show us the average times before and after the pilot. Give reader surveys. Tell us why you haven’t tried another pilot on another bus line."

Between 2009 and 2013 SEPTA was criticised for its use of sex identification markers on the SEPTA-issued monthly transit passes, as some transgender and gender-queer people had experienced discrimination related to the markers. These markers, SEPTA said, were an anti-fraud measure designed to prevent people in the same household sharing a monthly pass. However, the lobby group SEPTA Riders Against Gender Exclusion (SEPTA R.A.G.E) said that the sex identification markers had resulted in harassment, violence, and discrimination for those who did not physically match the stated sex on the pass. The markers on the monthly passes were stopped in June 2013.

In October 2020, SEPTA trialled the use of lean benches instead of traditional seating at some of its stations. This was criticized by some as lean benches are widely considered to be hostile architecture, designed to stop homeless populations using the stations to sleep. SEPTA stated that the use of the lean benches was to encourage social distancing to prevent the spread the COVID-19. These trials concluded in September 2021 with the removal of the lean benches.

See also 
 Doe v. Southeastern Pennsylvania Transportation Authority
 List of metro systems
 List of United States rapid transit systems by ridership
 Commuter rail in North America
 List of suburban and commuter rail systems
 List of United States commuter rail systems by ridership
 List of light rail transit systems
 List of United States light rail systems by ridership
 List of United States local bus agencies by ridership

Further reading 

John F. Tucker Transit History Collection (1895–2002) at Hagley Museum and Library.(includes records of the pre-SEPTA Philadelphia Rapid Transit Company and the Philadelphia Transportation Company for the period 1907–1968.)

References

External links

Official website

 
1965 establishments in Pennsylvania
Bus transportation in Pennsylvania
Commuter rail in the United States
Intermodal transportation authorities in Pennsylvania
Light rail in Pennsylvania
Rapid transit in Pennsylvania
Passenger rail transportation in Delaware
Passenger rail transportation in New Jersey
Passenger rail transportation in Pennsylvania
Municipal authorities in Pennsylvania
Public benefit corporations based in the United States
Tram, urban railway and trolley companies
Transportation in Philadelphia